The Santa Clara is Santa Clara University's weekly student newspaper. It publishes online every week and distributes 1,000 free in-print copies every third Friday during the academic year. The newspaper was founded under the same name on February 22, 1922.

The newspaper has received numerous awards for excellence, including the Associated Collegiate Press's Pacemaker prize in 2004 and 1995. The paper's website won the online version of the prize in 2006.

Notable past staffers of The Santa Clara include Dee Dee Myers, President Bill Clinton's press secretary and former Department of Homeland Security Secretary Janet Napolitano.

See also 
List of student newspapers

Awards 
1st Place: Regional Peacekeeper Award (1990, 1994/95, 1995/96, 1996/97
2nd Place: 2000, 2004/05, 2005/06
National Newspaper Peacemaker Award (1995)

References

External links 
 The Santa Clara online

Santa Clara University
Newspapers published in the San Francisco Bay Area
Student newspapers published in California
Weekly newspapers published in California